Treverance Donta Faulk (born August 6, 1981) is a former NFL American football linebacker.

College career
Faulk attended Louisiana State University (LSU).

Statistics

Professional career

Denver Broncos 

Faulk signed with the Broncos as an undrafted rookie free agent on April 29, 2002. He appeared in the week 1 preseason game against the Chicago Bears on August 10, 2002 and made 3 tackles and sacked quarterback Henry Burris for a loss of 9 yards. The Broncos went on to win the game 27-3. He made another appearance in week 2 and was on the roster in week 3 but did not play. He did not survive the preseason cuts and the Broncos waived him on August 26, 2002, making him a free agent.

Dallas Cowboys 

Faulk joined the Cowboys' practice squad on September 26, 2002. He was waived on November 15, 2002.

Arizona Cardinals 

Faulk signed with the Arizona Cardinals on December 11, 2002. He was on the inactive list through weeks 15 to 17 of the 2002 season but did not see any playing time. During the 2003 preseason, he appeared in the week 2 game against the San Diego Chargers on August 16, 2003 and made 2 tackles. He was waived on August 25, 2003.

St. Louis Rams 

He was picked up by the St. Louis Rams on December 31, 2003. He survived preseason cuts and made the 2004 regular season team for the first time in his career. He tore his hamstring in week 1 against the Cardinals and was sidelined for the next two games. He returned in week 4 against the 49ers, making 4 tackles. In 

the 2004 postseason, he made a total of 3 tackles, including one in the 27-20 win against the Seattle Seahawks. He led the franchise in special teams tackles during the 2004 season with 24 and was named Outstanding Special Teams player.

During a 2005 preseason match with the Chicago Bears, he brought down quarterback Rex Grossman who broke his ankle, sidelining him for the majority of the season. He signed a one-year contract extension with the Rams before the final regular season match in 2005. During the 2004 and 2005 seasons, he played a total of 29 regular season games and appeared in two postseason games. During the 2006 off-season, he underwent back surgery and missed the mini-camp in April. He was waived by the Rams on September 3, 2006.

New Orleans Saints 

After missing the 2006 season due to injury, he joined the New Orleans Saints on April 16, 2007. He appeared in the Hall of Fame game against the Pittsburgh Steelers during the 2007 preseason. He had 2 penalties on special teams and the Saints lost the game 7-20. He was released on August 8, 2007 and retired the same year.

Coaching career 

Faulk was working as a volunteer assistant at Northside High when he decided to try his hand at coaching.

In February 2011, Faulk was announced as the new head coach of Vermilion Catholic High School football team. Under his leadership, the Screaming Eagles went unbeaten in the 2011 regular season and reached the state semifinals, finishing 13-1.

He left Vermilion Catholic after one season in 2012 to come back to Northside High and become their head football coach. He resigned on October 9, 2015 and finished with a record of 11-21. He was then offered the position of business teacher at Acadiana High School.

Faulk became the head football coach at Lafayette Christian Academy in March 2016. In March 2019, the Louisiana High School Athletic Association (LHSAA) suspended Faulk along with basketball coach Devin Lantier for one calendar year. The suspension prevented them from performing any coaching duty at all LHSAA schools at any level in all sports. It was due to a policy that required head coaches for football and basketball to be faculty members at the school, whereas Faulk was working as a volunteer. LCA filed a lawsuit against the LHSAA in response to the sanctions. In September 2019, an apparent agreement was reached between the LCA and LHSAA, and Faulk resumed duties ahead the first game of the 2019 season, coaching from the press box. The Knights won the state championship under Faulk for four straight years, from 2017 to 2020. They fell short of winning a fifth title, losing 27-32 to St. Charles in the Division III championship.

Personal life
Faulk is the cousin of former New England Patriots running back Kevin Faulk, who is the son of his late aunt. There are conflicting reports of them being distantly related to former Indianapolis Colts and Rams running back Marshall Faulk.

References

External links
LSU Tigers Bio

1981 births
Living people
Sportspeople from Lafayette, Louisiana
American football linebackers
LSU Tigers football players
Arizona Cardinals players
St. Louis Rams players
New Orleans Saints players